This is a comprehensive discography of Jefferson Starship, a rock band from San Francisco that developed out of Jefferson Airplane in 1974.

Albums

Studio albums

Live albums

soundboard recordings
These were CDs recorded directly from the soundboard at the live shows and sold to concert attendees.  They were also sold online for a short time.

 Live at B. B. King's Blues Club (2000)
 Live at Vinoy Park (2000)
 Post Nine 11 (2001) (6 concerts released separately)
 UK (2002) (6 concerts released separately)
 Live (2003) (3 concerts released separately)
 Galactic Reunion Concert (2005)

Compilation albums

Singles

Other appearances

Collaborations

Videos

Music videos

References

External links
 

Discography
Discographies of American artists
Musical groups established in 1974
Rock music group discographies